The Province of Maine refers to any of the various English colonies established in the 17th century along the northeast coast of North America, within portions of the present-day U.S. states of Maine, New Hampshire, and Vermont, and the Canadian provinces of Quebec and New Brunswick. It existed through a series of land patents made by the kings of England during this era, and included New Somersetshire, Lygonia, and Falmouth (now Portland, Maine). The province was incorporated into the Massachusetts Bay Colony during the 1650s, beginning with the formation of York County, Massachusetts, which extended from the Piscataqua River to just east of the mouth of the Presumpscot River in Casco Bay. Eventually, its territory grew to encompass nearly all of present-day Maine.

History

1622 patent
The first patent establishing the Province of Maine was granted on August 10, 1622 to Sir Ferdinando Gorges and John Mason by the Plymouth Council for New England, which itself had been granted a royal patent by James I to the coast of North America between the 40th to the 48th parallel "from sea to sea". This first patent encompassed the coast between the Merrimack and Kennebec rivers, and an irregular parcel of land between the headwaters of the two rivers. In 1629, Gorges and Mason agreed to split the patent at the Piscataqua River, with Mason retaining the land south of the river as the Province of New Hampshire.

Gorges named his more northerly piece of territory New Somersetshire after his home county of Somerset in England.  Lack of funding and the absence of a royal charter held back development, and only a few small settlements were established. Gorges sought to create a neo-feudal community similar to western England. The colony was Anglican and Royalist, and so sided with the king in the English Civil War (1642–1651).

1639 patent
In 1639, Gorges obtained a renewed patent, the Gorges Patent, for the area between the Piscataqua and Kennebec Rivers, in the form of a royal charter from Charles I of England. The area was roughly the same as that covered in the 1622 patent after the 1629 split with Mason. This renewed colonization effort was also hampered by lack of money and settlers, but continued to survive even after the death of Gorges in 1647.

Absorption by Massachusetts

Beginning in the 1640s, the nearby Massachusetts Bay Colony began claiming territories north of the Merrimack River, because the Merrimack's northernmost point was farther north than its mouth. This resulted in its administration of the early settlements of what later became New Hampshire. After a survey made in the early 1650s, Massachusetts extended its land claims as far north as Casco Bay.  By 1658 Massachusetts had completed the assimilation of all of Gorges' original territory into its jurisdiction.

In 1664, Charles II of England made a grant to James, Duke of York for territories north and east of the Kennebec River. Under the terms of this patent the territory was incorporated into Cornwall County, part of the duke's proprietary Province of New York. The territory stipulated in this charter encompassed the areas between the Kennebec and St. Croix Rivers. This region, which had previously been called the Territory of Sagadahock, forms the eastern portion of the present-day state of Maine.  Charles had intended to include the former Gorges territory in this grant, but the Gorges' heirs instead chose to sell their remaining claims to Massachusetts.

In 1691 William III and Mary II issued a charter for the new Province of Massachusetts Bay that encompassed (in addition to other territories) the former claims of the Massachusetts Bay Colony, and those of the Duke of York.  The region remained a part of Massachusetts, the District of Maine, until it achieved statehood of its own in 1820.

See also
History of Maine
List of Maine land patents
List of colonial governors of Maine

References

External links
 Avalon Project Listing of early Maine patents and charters
 Library of Congress Grants of the Province of Maine

Province of Maine
History of the Thirteen Colonies
Dominion of New England
Former English colonies
History of New England
States and territories established in 1622
States and territories disestablished in 1658
Colonial United States (British)
1622 establishments in the British Empire
1622 establishments in the Thirteen Colonies
17th century in Maine